Charlotte Watson (born 23 April 1998) is a Scottish field hockey, who plays as a forward for Scotland and Great Britain.

Personal life
Charlotte Watson was born and raised in Dundee, Scotland.

Career

Club hockey
She plays club hockey in the Women's England Hockey League Premier Division for Loughborough Students.

She has previously played for Holcombe and in Scotland's Women's Premiership league for Dundee Wanderers.

National teams

Scotland
Watson made her senior international debut for Scotland in 2016, during a test match against South Africa in Cape Town.

In 2018, Watson was a member of the Scottish team at the 2018 Commonwealth Games in the Gold Coast.

Her most prominent appearance in Scottish colours to date was in 2019 at the EuroHockey Championship II in Glasgow. At the tournament, Watson scored Scotland's second goal in the final, helping the team to a 2–1 win and their third Gold Medal at the event.

Great Britain
In 2019, Watson was given her first call up to the Great Britain women's team. Her first appearance was during a test match against Japan in Hiroshima. Following her debut, Watson went on to represent the team during a test series against India and at the FIH Olympic Qualifiers, in Marlow and London respectively.

International Goals

References

External links
 
 

1998 births
Living people
Female field hockey forwards
Sportspeople from Dundee
Scottish female field hockey players
British female field hockey players
Field hockey players at the 2022 Commonwealth Games